AT&T refers to several related companies providing telecommunications services:

History of AT&T, a history of the various companies using this name, including:
AT&T Corporation, the original AT&T founded 1885 (formerly American Telephone & Telegraph), now a subsidiary of AT&T, Inc.
AT&T Communications Inc., provided long-distance services for AT&T Corporation (defunct)
AT&T, Inc., the current company providing a wide range of telecommunications service, originally one of the Baby Bells which acquired other systems, and formerly known as Southwestern Bell Corporation (SBC)
AT&T Communications, houses most of AT&T Inc.'s Telecommunications and Technology Businesses
Bell System, known as Ma Bell, AT&T Corporation's system of companies that held a monopoly on phone service in the US for most of the 20th century
Regional Bell Operating Company, known as Baby Bells, the companies formed from AT&T Corporations's 1984 split

AT&T may also refer to:

Telecommunications
AT&T Bell Laboratories, a former research & development subsidiary of AT&T
AT&T Corporation, the original AT&T founded 1885 (formerly American Telephone & Telegraph), purchased by SBC in 2005
AT&T Information Systems, founded 1982 (formerly American Bell), an unregulated business subsidiary of AT&T Corp.
Alascom dba AT&T Alascom, founded 1900 (formerly Washington-Alaska Military Cable and Telegraph System), a long-distance company
AT&T Labs, founded 1988 (formerly Southwestern Bell Technology Resources), the R&D division of AT&T Inc.
AT&T Laboratories, founded 1925 as part of Bell Labs and AT&T Corp., later spun off and now absorbed into AT&T Labs
AT&T Communications (formerly AT&T Long Lines), an operating company serving the regions of the Bell Operating Companies
AT&T CallVantage, a voice-over-internet-protocol service formerly offered by AT&T Corp. and then AT&T Inc.
AT&T Mobility, the wireless provider subsidiary of AT&T Inc. (formerly Cingular Wireless)
AT&T Wireless Services, the former wireless provider subsidiary that became part of Cingular Wireless
AT&T Technologies, founded 1983, a telephone producer, the postdivestiture successor to Western Electric
AT&T Broadband, founded 1999 (now part of Comcast), once the largest U.S. provider of cable television services
Advanced American Telephones, founded 1983, a manufacturer of AT&T branded phones (formerly AT&T Consumer Products)
Bell Labs, founded 1925 (formerly also called Bell Telephone Laboratories, Inc., and later AT&T Bell Laboratories), a Nobel Prize–winning research and development organization
Lucent, founded 1983 (now part of Alcatel-Lucent), the primary successor to Bell Labs and AT&T Technologies

Locations
One AT&T Plaza (Whitacre Tower), headquarters of AT&T Inc.
AT&T Building (disambiguation), the name of several buildings
AT&T (SEPTA station), a station on SEPTA's Broad Street Line in Philadelphia
AT&T Stadium, home stadium of the Dallas Cowboys of the National Football League (NFL)
AT&T Park, home park of the San Francisco Giants of Major League Baseball (MLB)

Other
AT&T, assembly language syntax
Aircraft Transport and Travel, a 1910s British airline

See also
AT&T breakup